In Flanders Fields is a poem by John McCrae.

In Flanders Fields may also refer to:

 In Flanders Fields Museum, a museum in Ypres, Belgium
 In Flanders Fields: The 1917 Campaign, a book by historian Leon Wolff
 In Flanders Fields, a song from The Great War album by Sabaton

See also
Flanders Field (disambiguation)